Dureford Abbey, in Sussex, England, was a Premonstratensian monastery. It was founded by Henry Hussey who in 1161 granted land to the abbot of Welbeck Abbey, to establish the new community near Rogate, Sussex.

A History of Disaster
The founder and other local landowners granted much additional land in the area to the abbey and the unlimited use of a quarry from which to construct the monastic buildings.

In 1317 the abbot complained as the abbey had been broken into and robbed. A royal visit by the King in 1324 put a further strain on the finances, as did repeated incidences of theft and malicious damage, which left the community reportedly poverty stricken by 1335.

The next century was no better as in 1417 the tower of the abbey church was struck by lightning and collapsed. Further, an abbot was forcibly ejected from his position by canons from Dureford and from Bayham Abbey. He apparently left in fear for his life, and additionally, the canons of Bayham stole £400 worth of goods including vestments.

In 1444 abbot Stephen Mersey was deposed for neglecting the monastery buildings and for plunging the abbey into debt.

On three occasions in the 1450s the abbey was invaded by Sir Henry Hussey (a patron of the monastery and descendant of the founder), who came with an armed band and threatened to burn the monastery and kill the abbot. As it was, he murdered one of the abbey servants.

By 1482 the abbey debts had been wiped out. Unfortunately so had most of the community, who had died in an outbreak of the plague or black death. There were further burnings of the buildings resulting in more debt and the cloister was reportedly in a ruinous state. In 1497 the canons were criticised for being lax in their duties and for leaving the monastery grounds.

By 1535 the monastery was dilapidated and in considerable debt, and was referred to mockingly as 'Dirtforde' by Richard Layton, one of the king's officials, who visited it. That same year, the abbey's income was assessed in the Valor Ecclesiasticus, Henry VIII's great survey of church finances, at £108 13s. 9d, which meant the following year that it came under the terms of the first Suppression Act, Henry's initial move in the Dissolution of the Monasteries.In 1536 the abbey was closed by the king and the site was granted to Sir William Fitzwilliam. The last abbot, John Sympson, was appointed head of Titchfield Abbey in Hampshire but resigned in less than a year. He was later given the living of Horsted Keynes.

Post Dissolution 
A farmhouse built in 1784 now occupies the site, and fragments of carved stone and a coffin lid are amongst the few visible remnants. The only surviving building is that of a medieval barn, and there are some fragmentary remains of a water-mill nearby.

See also
Abbeys and priories in England

References 
'Houses of Premonstratensian canons: Abbey of Dureford', A History of the County of Sussex: Volume 2 (1973), pp. 89–92.
 Anthony New. 'A Guide to the Abbeys of England And Wales', p157. Constable.

Monasteries in West Sussex
1536 disestablishments in England
1161 establishments in England
Premonstratensian monasteries in England
Christian monasteries established in the 12th century